Vettri TV is a Tamil television service in Sri Lanka. The channel started broadcasting on 17 September 2009, the same day as its Sinhala sister station Siyatha TV.

Notable people 
 Janany Kunaseelan - Sri Lankan Tamil television anchor and actress. She appeared in Star Tamil TV as a television anchor for cooking shows and as an actress for comedy shows like Dak Dik Dos on IBC Tamil. In 2022, She participated in Bigg Boss Tamil 6. She was evicted on the 70th day. She is set to make her Tamil cinema debut in the highly anticipated film tentatively titled Thalapathy 67 directed by Lokesh Kanagaraj and starring Vijay.

References

Tamil-language television stations in Sri Lanka